Ecru is still defined by some dictionaries as the colour of unbleached linen, which it still is in French (hex code = #FEFEE0 ). Over the years it has come to be  used for a quite different, much darker color.

Ecru comes from the French word écru for the color of unbleached linen, and the word means "raw, unbleached" in French.

It has also been known as "the colour of silk".

Traditionally ecru was considered a shade of beige. Beginning in the 19th century it became more precisely defined as "a grayish yellow that is greener and paler than chamois or old ivory". 

The normalized colour coordinates for ecru are identical to sand, which was first recorded as a colour name in English in 1627.

See also
 Lists of colors

References

Bibliography

Citations

External links 

 ISCC-NBS Dictionary of Color Names (1955) – "Color Sample of Ecru (colour sample #90)"

Shades of brown